Butley is a village and civil parish in the English county of Suffolk.

Administratively, Butley forms part of the East Suffolk district; from 1934 to 1974 it had been part of the former Deben Rural District, and then from 1974 to 2019 it had been part of the former Suffolk Coastal District Council.

The parish church of St John the Baptist dates from the 12th century, but was much restored in 1868. It is a grade II* listed building.

Butley Priory

Butley Priory was a religious institution established founded in 1171 when nearby Orford was a major town. It was suppressed in 1538 during the dissolution of the monasteries.

References

External links 

Some illustrated information, mainly about the parish church
GENUKI page
Pictures of Butley on geograph.org.uk

Villages in Suffolk
Civil parishes in Suffolk